Tsvetnoy Bulvar is a Moscow Metro station on the Serpukhovsko-Timiryazevskaya Line, in the Tverskoy District of central Moscow. It was opened on 31 December 1988.

Name
It is named after Tsvetnoy Boulevard.

Location
The entrance vestibule is located on Tsvetnoy Boulevard, close to the Moscow Circus on Tsvetnoy Boulevard. Its proximity to the circus is reflected in the subject of the green stained glass seen in the entrance hall above the stairs. Which has images of clowns .

Transfers

Since 2007 the station provides transfer to the  station of the Lyublinskaya Line.

References

External links

Moscow Metro stations
Serpukhovsko-Timiryazevskaya Line
Tverskoy District
Railway stations in Russia opened in 1988
Railway stations located underground in Russia